Gravesham is a constituency in Kent represented in the House of Commons of the UK Parliament since 2005 by Adam Holloway, a Conservative.

Constituency profile
The seat covers the historic riverside town of Gravesend and a more rural area extending to Higham and Vigo Village on the North Downs. The electorate voted strongly to leave in the 2016 EU referendum. Health and wealth are roughly average for the UK.

Boundaries

Since the constituency's creation, its boundaries have been co-terminous with those of the Borough of Gravesham. The largest town in the constituency is Gravesend.

History
This particular name of the seat was created in 1983 effectively as the new name for the Gravesend seat.

The constituency and its predecessor together was considered a bellwether seat: from World War I until 2005 with the exceptions of the General Elections in 1929 Election and 1951, its winner came from the winning party. In 2005 Adam Holloway was one of 36 Conservative candidates to gain a seat from other parties, and has held the seat since then. Since the 2005 result conflicted with the UK outcome, the seat is regarded as having lost its bellwether status.

Members of Parliament

Elections

Elections in the 2010s

Elections in the 2000s

Elections in the 1990s

Elections in the 1980s

See also
List of parliamentary constituencies in Kent

Notes

References

Gravesham
Parliamentary constituencies in Kent
Constituencies of the Parliament of the United Kingdom established in 1983